Mayadyk (Miäźäk) is a rural locality (a selo) and the administrative centre of Mayadykovsky Selsoviet, Dyurtyulinsky District, Bashkortostan, Russia. The population was 602 as of 2010. There are 6 streets.

Geography 
Mayadyk is located 28 km northeast of Dyurtyuli (the district's administrative centre) by road. Starokangyshevo is the nearest rural locality.

References 

Rural localities in Dyurtyulinsky District